Benin participated at the 2017 Summer Universiade in Taipei, Taiwan with one competitor in one sport.

Competitors 
The following table lists Benin's delegation per sport and gender.

Taekwondo

References 

Nations at the 2017 Summer Universiade
2017 in Belarusian sport